Paulie Malignaggi vs. Adrien Broner, was a boxing welterweight championship fight for Malignaggi's WBA welterweight title. The bout was held on June 22, 2013, at the Barclays Center in Brooklyn, New York, United States on Showtime. The undercard included the rematch Johnathon Banks and Seth Mitchell.

Fight Card

International broadcasting

External links
Fight Card from BoxRec
Showtime Sports
Mayweather Promotions

Boxing matches
2013 in boxing
Events in Brooklyn, New York
Boxing matches in New York City
Sports in Brooklyn
2013 in sports in New York (state)
Golden Boy Promotions
Boxing articles needing attention
June 2013 sports events in the United States